The Milton Keynes Citizen is the only freely distributed local newspaper in Milton Keynes. The newspaper is part of JPIMedia.

The MK Citizen was founded by Bill Alder and Jerry West on 1 October 1981 and they sold to EMAP in 1987 and the purchase was completed in April 1990. Emap sold the paper to Johnston Publishing in the 1990s.

Distribution 
The Milton Keynes Citizen is distributed freely across Milton Keynes and its local authority area on Thursday.

There was formerly a more limited circulation Tuesday sister paper, Citizen First which was distributed on Tuesdays (this was formerly the Citizen on Sunday but changed when MK News launched on Wednesdays). This is no longer published.

The paper's main print competitor was the MK News, part of LSN Media Ltd., which closed in October 2016.

External links
 

Newspapers published in Buckinghamshire
Milton Keynes
Newspapers published by Johnston Press
1981 establishments in England
Newspapers established in 1981